Jonathan Horne (born 17 January 1989) is a German karateka. At the 2018 World Karate Championships in Madrid, Spain, he won the gold medal in the men's +84 kg event. He represented Germany at the 2020 Summer Olympics in Tokyo, Japan.

He also won the gold medal in his event on seven occasions at the European Karate Championships, most recently at the 2021 European Karate Championships held in Poreč, Croatia.

Career 

He won the gold medal in the men's kumite +80 kg event at the 2009 World Games held in Kaohsiung, Taiwan.

In 2013, he represented Germany at the World Games held in Cali, Colombia and he won the gold medal in the men's kumite +84 kg event. In 2017, he competed in the men's kumite +84 kg event at the World Games held in Wrocław, Poland. He was eliminated in the elimination round.

He won the silver medal in the men's +84 kg event at the 2015 European Games held in Baku, Azerbaijan. At the 2019 European Games held in Minsk, Belarus, he won one of the bronze medals in the men's +84 kg event.

In 2019, he won the gold medal in his event at the European Karate Championships held in Guadalajara, Spain.

In 2021, at the 2020 Summer Olympics while fighting Gogita Arkania in the men's +75 kg event, Horne broke his right arm leaving him unable to continue.

Achievements

References

External links 

 
 Personal website

Living people
1989 births
People from Kaiserslautern
German male karateka
European Games silver medalists for Germany
European Games bronze medalists for Germany
Karateka at the 2015 European Games
Karateka at the 2019 European Games
European Games medalists in karate
Competitors at the 2009 World Games
Competitors at the 2013 World Games
Competitors at the 2017 World Games
World Games gold medalists
World Games medalists in karate
Karateka at the 2020 Summer Olympics
Olympic karateka of Germany
Sportspeople from Rhineland-Palatinate
21st-century German people